WAY-267464 is a potent, selective, non-peptide agonist for the oxytocin receptor, with negligible affinity for the vasopressin receptors. Contradictorily however, though originally described as selective for the oxytocin receptor and lacking affinity for the vasopressin receptors, it has since been reported to also act as a potent vasopressin V1A receptor antagonist (in contrast to oxytocin, which is a weak agonist of the V1A receptor). WAY-267464 has been shown to cross the blood-brain-barrier to a significantly greater extent than exogenously applied oxytocin, and in animal tests produces centrally-mediated oxytocinergic actions such as anxiolytic effects, but with no antidepressant effect evident. It was developed by a team at Ferring Pharmaceuticals.

WAY-267464 is or was under investigation for the potential clinical treatment of anxiety disorders by Wyeth.

See also
 TC OT 39

References

Anxiolytics
Resorcinols
Piperazines
Benzamides
Oxytocin receptor agonists
Vasopressin receptor antagonists